2006 in Ghana details events of note that happened in Ghana in the year 2006.

Incumbents
 President: John Kufuor
 Vice President: Aliu Mahama
 Chief Justice: George Kingsley Acquah

Events

January
23rd - Archbishop Peter Derry is  appointed Cardinal by The Vatican at age 88

February

March
6 March - 49th independence anniversary
25th - Otumfuo Osei-Tutu II inducted Chancellor of Kwame Nkrumah University of Science and Technology (KNUST).
29th - Ghana experiences solar eclipse

April

May

June
 June - The national football team the Black Stars play in the 2006 FIFA World Cup

July

August

September

October

November

December
21st - NDC holds delegates' congress, John Atta Mills emerges presidential candidate for the third time

Date unknown
Emmanuel Arthur, a Ghanaian journalist is awarded the Ghana Journalists Association Television News Reporter of the year.

National holidays
Holidays in italics are "special days", while those in regular type are "regular holidays".
 January 1: New Year's Day
 March 6: Independence Day
 May 1: Labor Day
 December 25: Christmas
 December 26: Boxing Day

In addition, several other places observe local holidays, such as the foundation of their town. These are also "special days."

References